P'isaqa (Aymara and Quechua for Nothoprocta, a bird, also spelled Phisaca) is a mountain east of the Apolobamba mountain range in the Andes of Bolivia, about  high. It is located in the La Paz Department, Franz Tamayo Province, Pelechuco Municipality. P'isaqa lies north of the little town of Pelechuco, southeast of Rit'i Apachita and east of Puka Puka.

References 

Mountains of La Paz Department (Bolivia)